Elections to the Northampton Borough Council were held on 6 May 1999.  The whole council was up for election with boundary changes since the last election in 1995 increasing the number of seats by 4.  The Labour party stayed in overall control of the council.

Election result

|}

Ward Results

Numbers in parentheses indicate number of candidates to be elected.

External links
1999 Northampton election result

1999 English local elections
1999
1990s in Northamptonshire